Tong Jong-ho (born 1956) is a North Korean politician. He is Vice Premier of North Korea in the North Korean Cabinet. He previously served as Minister of Construction and Building Industry and the Political Bureau of the Central Committee of the Workers' Party of Korea. He was delegate to the 12th convocation of the Supreme People's Assembly. He is a permanent chairman of the Korean Marathon Association.

Biography
In August 2003, he was head of the department of Science and Technology of the Ministry of Construction. Since April 2014 until April 2019, he served as Minister of construction and building materials industries. Since April 2005, he has been a permanent chairman of the Korea Marathon Association. In September 2010, he was elected a candidate member of the Central Committee of the Workers' Party of Korea. In April 2009, he was elected as delegate to the 12th convocation of the Supreme People's Assembly. He was appointed the Vice Premier in May 2017. When Kim Jong-il died in 2011, he was a member of his funeral committee.

References

Workers' Party of Korea politicians
Government ministers of North Korea
Members of the Supreme People's Assembly
1956 births
Living people
People from South Pyongan
People from Nampo